Whiston is a village in the English county of Northamptonshire four miles due east of the county town of Northampton. It means "the farmstead of the Hwicce tribe." At the 2011 Census the population of the village remained less than 100 and was included in the civil parish of Brafield and Yardley.

The Church 
Whiston Church is dedicated to St Mary the Virgin. The present building was built for Anthony Catesby in the early 16th century. It is on the hill, separated from the rest of the village, from where it is reached by a footpath. The tower was built first and the church was probably complete by 1534.

Quarrying 
Quarrying for iron ore and limestone was carried out at Whiston between 1914 and about 1922. The quarry was to the south west of the village adjoining an earlier quarry at Cogenhoe. The quarrying must at first have been done by hand with the aid of explosives but a steam navvy and a transporter machine was brought in in 1915. The ore was taken away by a steeply graded standard gauge railway leading to sidings at the London & North Western Railway's Northampton to Peterborough line. This was operated by a steam locomotive (a saddle tank engine built by Andrew Barclay Sons & Co Ltd.) The gradient was in favour of the loaded trains.

References

External links

Villages in Northamptonshire
West Northamptonshire District